El Indio (Spanish for 'The Indian') may refer to:

 El indio, a 1939 Mexican drama film
 El indio (1953 film), by Filipino director Eddie Romero
 El Indio Gold Belt, a mineral-rich region across the Argentina–Chile border
 El Indio (album), a 2003 dancehall/ragga album by Lord Kossity
 El Indio, Texas, a census-designated place
 Pedro Arispe (1900–1960), a Uruguayan footballer
 A character in For a Few Dollars More, a 1965 spaghetti western
 I.Ae. 19 El Indio, a nine-cylinder air-cooled radial aircraft engine, with a power of about 690 hp, designed by the Instituto Aerotécnico (I.Ae.), Argentina, in 1947

See also 
 Indio (disambiguation)